Viva Flamenco! is the second and highly anticipated sequel to "Flamenco: Fire and Grace" – flamenco collection from Narada Productions.  Its liner notes contain brief biographies with pictures of each performer as they appear in sequence.

On Narada Productions web site, track 13 "Chanela by Paco de Lucía" is not listed.  However, every where that still sell the compilation, includes the track.

Track listing
La Enredadera – De Madera – 4:53
Mi Tiempo – Rafael Riqueni – 2:14
Al Aire – Pepe Habichuela – 5:11
El Cambio (edit)- Miguel de la Bastide – 4:54
Se Alza la Luna – Juan Manuel Cañizares – 4:13
Primavera – José Mercé – 3:37
Montoya – Tomatito – 5:30
Barrio Santiago – Gino D'Auri – 3:15
Sevilla – Gerardo Núñez – 3:46
Nana de Colores – Diego Carrasco – 4:18
A los Niños que Sufren – El Viejín – 5:21
Alhambra – Guadíana – 4:26
Chanela – Paco de Lucía – 3:56
Entre Rosas y Jazmines – Chuscales – 6:11

Musicians

 De Madera – guitars (duet)
 Rafael Riqueni – guitar
 Pepe Habichuela – guitar
 Miguel de la Bastide – guitar
 Juan Manuel Cañizares – guitar
 José Mercé – vocal
 Tomatito – guitar
 Gino D'Auri – guitar
 Gerardo Núñez – guitar
 Diego Carrasco – vocal
 El Viejín – guitar
 Guadíana – vocal
 Paco de Lucía – guitar
 Chuscales – guitar

References

External links 
 Viva Flamenco! from Narada.com
 Pepe Habichuela
 Juan Manuel Cañizares
 Gino D'Auri
 Diego Carrasco (español)
 El Viejín
 Guadíana
 Chuscales

2000 compilation albums
Flamenco compilation albums